The FC Basel 1936–37 season was the forty-fourth season since the club's foundation on 15 November 1893. FC Basel played their home games in the Landhof in the district Wettstein in Kleinbasel. Emil Junker was the new club chairman and it was his second period as chairman, after his short period in 1927. Junker toll over as club president from Franz Rinderer.

Overview 
Heinz Körner was appointed as new team manager. He followed Alwin Riemke who moved to Germany to manage SpVgg Greuther Fürth. Körner had been manager of Aarau the previous season. He was the tenth professional team manager/trainer in Basel's history, their tenth foreign trainer. How long Körner stayed with the club is not clearly stated, but he left during the season, and afterwards Fernand Jaccard took over as player-manager. Jaccard was the club's first professional Swiss trainer. Basel played a total of 40 matches in their 1936–37 season. 26 of these matches were in the Nationalliga, one in the Swiss Cup and 13 were friendly matches. Of these 13 friendlies eight were played at home in the Landhof, three others in Switzerland and one each as visitors to RC Strasbourg and to SC Freiburg.

Further league reforms took place before the season started. The number of teams in the 1936–37 Nationalliga was reduced by one team, thus contested by 13 teams and played as round-robin. Two teams were to be relegated and only one promoted to reduce the number of teams to 12 the following year. Basel played a very poor and un-consistent season. Only thanks to four consecutive victories towards the end of the campaign lifted the team to finish in joint second last position in the league table. Because La Chaux-de-Fonds and Basel both had 20 points, they had to have a play-off against relegation. This ended in a draw and so a replay was required. The replay was played in the Stadion Neufeld in Bern on 20 June 1937 and ended in a 1–0 victory for Basel and so they prevented relegation at the last possible moment.

In the 1st principal round of the Swiss Cup Basel were drawn at home in the Landhof against lower tier Concordia Basel and were defeated and knocked out of the competition. Grasshopper Club won both championship and cup.

Players 
The following is the list of the Basel first team squad during the season 1936–37. The list includes players that were in the squad the day the season started on 2 August 1936 but subsequently left the club after that date.

 
 

 

Players who left the squad

Results

Legend

Friendly matches

Pre-season

Mid-season

Nationalliga

League matches

Play-off against relegation

League table

Swiss Cup

See also 
 History of FC Basel
 List of FC Basel players
 List of FC Basel seasons

References

Sources 
 Rotblau: Jahrbuch Saison 2014/2015. Publisher: FC Basel Marketing AG. 
 Die ersten 125 Jahre. Publisher: Josef Zindel im Friedrich Reinhardt Verlag, Basel. 
 FCB team 1936/37 at fcb-archiv.ch
 Switzerland 1936/37 by Erik Garin at Rec.Sport.Soccer Statistics Foundation

External links
 FC Basel official site

FC Basel seasons
Basel